"It's All Love" is the debut single from hard rock supergroup Rock Star Supernova, released on the self-titled debut album.

Rock Star: Supernova
The song was only one of four tracks from the album that were performed on the reality show, Rock Star: Supernova. While on the show, it was performed with Magni Ásgeirsson but on the finale Lukas Rossi sang it with the band after being chosen as the lead singer.

Gemini Awards
Lukas Rossi and Gilby Clarke performed an acoustic version of the song at the Gemini Awards.

Chart performance

External links
 Rock Star Supernova official band site

2006 singles
Songs written by Butch Walker
Songs written by Tommy Lee
Song recordings produced by Butch Walker
Songs written by Scott Humphrey